Ivan Andreevich Gakhov (born 4 November 1996) is a Russian tennis player.

Gakhov has a career high ATP singles ranking of world No. 252 achieved on 17 October 2022. He also has a career high doubles ranking of world No. 170 achieved on 17 September 2018.

Gakhov has won 1 ATP Challenger doubles title at the 2018 Fergana Challenger.

Ranked No. 315, he made his ATP singles main draw debut at the 2022 Generali Open Kitzbühel as a lucky loser where he lost to Yannick Hanfmann.

Challenger and Futures/World Tennis Tour Finals

Singles: 29 (14–15)

Doubles: 4 (1 title, 3 runners-up)

Awards
2019
 The Russian Cup in the nomination Student Tennis Players of the Year

References

External links
 
 

1996 births
Living people
Russian male tennis players
Tennis players from Moscow
Universiade medalists in tennis
Universiade gold medalists for Russia
Universiade silver medalists for Russia
Universiade bronze medalists for Russia
Medalists at the 2019 Summer Universiade